"Daydreams About Night Things" is a song written by John Schweers, and recorded by American country music artist Ronnie Milsap.  It was released in July 1975 as the first single from the album Night Things.  The song was Milsap's eighth hit on the country chart and his fourth number one on the country chart.  The single stayed at number one for two weeks and spent a total of eleven weeks on the country chart.

Chart performance

References

1975 singles
Ronnie Milsap songs
RCA Records singles
Songs written by John Schweers
Song recordings produced by Tom Collins (record producer)
1975 songs